Edward Taylor Lewis (October 26, 1834 – April 26, 1927) was a member of the United States House of Representatives from Louisiana for one term from 1883 to 1885.

Life and career
Lewis was born on October 26, 1834 in Opelousas, Louisiana. His parents were William Lewis and Ellen Claudia Taylor Lewis.

He attended Wesleyan University of Ohio, earning a law degree, and returning to his home state to work as an attorney.

During the American Civil War, he was a Captain in Company G, 2nd Louisiana Cavalry. After the war and Louisiana's Reconstruction, he served one term in the Louisiana House of Representatives from 1865 to 1867.

Congress
In 1883, he was elected to Congress, serving one term as a Democrat before an unsuccessful renomination bid. From 1886 to 1892, he again was a member of the state House of Representatives, and he worked at various judgeships between 1886 and 1908.

He then resumed the practice of law, and died on April 26, 1927 in Opelousas.

Personal
Edward Lewis married Alphonsine Lastrapes and had three children; Edward, Julia and Corinne. His wife predeceased him in 1893. He is buried in Myrtle Grove Cemetery, Opelousas, Louisiana.

Notes

References

1834 births
1927 deaths
Democratic Party members of the United States House of Representatives from Louisiana
Democratic Party members of the Louisiana House of Representatives